Anjong of Goryeo (died 24 July 996), personal name Wang Uk, was a Goryeo Royal Prince as the only child of King Taejo and Queen Sinseong. He later became the father of King Hyeonjong.

Biography
After King Gyeongjong's death in 981, Queen Heonjeong started to live in her own mansion, which was close to Wang Uk's, so the two often met and spent time together. Eventually, Heonjeong had a son with him, Wang Sun (왕순; the future Hyeonjong of Goryeo), but died during childbirth.

Wang Uk was exiled to Sasu-hyeon (nowadays Sacheon-si, Gyeongsangnam-do, South Korea) because of his affair with the widowed queen, who was also his niece. Wang Sun was entrusted to one of King Seongjong's nannies, but missed his father, so the king decided to send Sun to live with Wang Uk. Together, they lived in Gwiyangji until Uk's death on 24 July 996. Wang Sun returned to the capital in 997, and, when he ascended to the throne, granted a posthumous name to his father.

Family
Father: Wang Geon, King Taejo (태조 왕건; 877–943)
Grandfather: Wang Ryung (왕륭; d. 897)
Grandmother: Lady Han (부인 한씨)
Mother: Queen Sinseong (신성왕후)
Grandfather: Gim Eok-ryeom (김억렴)
Wives and children:
Unknown woman (Consort Sunan – half younger sister; disputed)
Grand Princess Seongmok (성목장공주)
Queen Dowager Hyosuk of the Hwangju Hwangbo clan (효숙왕태후 황보씨)
Wang Sun, Prince Daeryangwon (왕순 대량원군; 992–1031); became the 8th ruler of Goryeo.

Posthumous name
In April 1017 (8th year reign of King Hyeonjong), name Yi-jang (이장, 移葬) was added at first but later was removed?
One month later in May 1017, name Heon-gyeong (헌경, 憲景) was added.
In 1021 (12th year reign of King Hyeonjong), name Hyo-mok (효목, 孝穆) and Hyo-ui (효의, 孝懿) was added.
In April 1027 (18th year reign of King Hyeonjong), name Seong-deok (성덕, 聖德) was added to his Posthumous name.

In popular culture
Portrayed by Kim Ho-jin in the 2009 KBS TV series Empress Cheonchu.
Portrayed by Nam Joo-hyuk in the 2016 SBS TV Series Moon Lovers: Scarlet Heart Ryeo.

References

External links
고려 안종 on Encykorea .
고려 안종 on Doosan Encyclopedia .

Year of birth unknown
10th-century births
996 deaths
Anti-kings
10th-century Korean monarchs